Clube Atlético Mineiro is a Brazilian professional football club based in Belo Horizonte, Minas Gerais, Brazil. The club has played in the Brasileirão, the top tier of the Brazilian football league system, throughout all of its history with the exception of one season, as well as in all editions of the Campeonato Mineiro, the premier state league of Minas Gerais, while also taking part in numerous CONMEBOL-organised international competitions. 

This chronological list comprises those who have held the position of head coach of the first team of Atlético Mineiro since 1926, the date of the first available data for a club manager. Each manager's entry includes his years of tenure, honours won and significant achievements while under his care, where available. Caretaker managers are included, where known. As of 2023, Atlético Mineiro has had 88 known full-time managers.

The first known full-time manager for Atlético Mineiro was Chico Neto, who managed the club in 1926. Cuca and Levir Culpi jointly hold the record for most trophies won, with six each. Telê Santana is the club's longest-serving manager, with 434 matches during three periods in the 1970s and 1980s.

List of managers

Italics denote a caretaker manager.

Records

Most games managed
The following are the managers with the most matches in charge of the club.

References
General
Atlético Mineiro managers:

Atlético Mineiro matches with manager information:

Specific

 
Atletico Mineiro
Managers